Aleksandr Yuryevich Rogov (born 4 June 1986) is a former Russian footballer.

Club career
He made his Russian Football National League debut for FC Metallurg-Kuzbass Novokuznetsk on 28 March 2007 in a game against FC Shinnik Yaroslavl.

External links
  Player page on the official FC Dynamo St. Petersburg website

1986 births
Footballers from Moscow
Living people
Russian footballers
Association football midfielders
FC Dynamo Moscow reserves players
FC Novokuznetsk players
FC Dynamo Saint Petersburg players